Sad Singalong Songs is the eighth studio album by Dutch singer Anouk. The album was released on 17 May 2013 by her own record label Goldilox. On 27 December 2012, Anouk released the song "Stardust" via her own YouTube-channel as a preview to her new sound. It was also available as a free download. The album is preceded by the single "Birds", which she performed at the Eurovision Song Contest 2013 in Malmö. Anouk herself revealed the cover art and track listing on her official website.

Track listing
 "The Rules"
 "Pretending as Always"
 "Birds"
 "The Good Life"
 "Are You Lonely"
 "Stardust"
 "Only a Mother"
 "Kill"
 "I Don't Know Nothing"
 "The Black Side of My Mind"

Critical reception
As it was released in the wake of her Eurovision participation, the album received reviews from a number of Eurovision fansites. Nick Van Lith of escXtra described it as "an impressive album which is anything but mainstream"; whereas Rory Gannon of ESC Views hailed it as a "departure from her previous albums" which "showed Anouk is a versatile singer and not just a one-trick pony".

Chart performance

Weekly charts

Year-end charts

Certifications

References

2013 albums
Anouk (singer) albums